Chisato Inoue (born 27 October 2002) is a Japanese professional footballer who plays as a defender for WE League club JEF United Chiba.

Club career 
Inoue made her WE League debut on 16 October 2021.

References

External links 
 

Living people
2002 births
Association football people from Chiba Prefecture
Women's association football defenders
Japanese women's footballers
JEF United Chiba Ladies players
WE League players